Naturally occurring phenethylamines are organic compounds which may be thought of as being derived from phenethylamine itself that are found in living organisms.

Tyramine is a phenethylamine that occurs widely in plants and animals, and is metabolized by various enzymes, including monoamine oxidases. Substituted phenethylamines like mescaline and lophophine are found in psychoactive cactus.

List of phenethylamines

References

Phenethylamines
Phenethylamine alkaloids
Psychedelic phenethylamine carriers